Fosbury may refer to:

 Fosbury, a village in Wiltshire, England
 Fosbury Camp, the site of an Iron Age hillfort in Wiltshire, England
 Dick Fosbury (1947–2023), American athlete
 Fosbury Flop, a style of high jump named after Dick Fosbury
 Robert Fosbury, British astronomer